Leroni of Darkover is an anthology of fantasy and science fiction short stories edited by American writer Marion Zimmer Bradley. The stories are set in Bradley's world of Darkover. The book was first published by DAW Books (No. 865) in November 1991.

Contents
 Introduction by Marion Zimmer Bradley
 "Building" by Lynn Michals
 "The Ferment" by Janet R. Rhodes
 "Wings" by Diana Gill
 "The Rebel" by Deborah J. Mays
 "A Dance for Darkover" by Diana Perry and Vera Nazarian
 "There Is Always Someone" by Jacquie Groom
 "Reunion" by Lawrence Schimel
 "A Way Through the Fog" by Patricia B. Cirone
 "The Gods' Gift" by Mary K. Frey
 "The Speaking Touch" by Margaret L. Carter
 "The Bargain" by Chel Avery
 "The Witch of the Kilghard Hills" by Aimee Kratts
 "The Gift" by Lynne Armstrong-Jones
 "Invitation to Chaos" by Joan Marie Verba
 "The Keeper's Peace" by Patricia Duffy Novak
 "Food for the Worms" by Roxana Pierson
 "Childish Pranks" by Diann S. Partridge
 "Cherilly's Law" by Janni Lee Simner
 "Avarra's Children" by Dorothy J. Heydt
 "The Tower at New Skye" by Priscilla W. Armstrong
 "Homecoming" by Lana Young
 "A Meeting of Minds" by Elisabeth Waters

Sources
 
 
 
 

Darkover books
1991 anthologies
American anthologies
Fantasy anthologies
Works by Marion Zimmer Bradley
DAW Books books